Looking Back is the fourth solo studio album by Leon Russell. The album was released in 1973, shortly after the success of his single song "Tightrope". The album is not an official release: it features instrumental tracks that were recorded in the mid-1960s. Some of the songs feature Russell playing the harpsichord. The record and album sleeve do not have any credits for the songs. Released on Olympic Records Corporation label. There was short issue new CD reissue in 1991 on the Japanese Jimco label, with three bonus tracks.

Track listing

Side One
"If I Had a Hammer" - 2:49
"Gospel Harp" - 2:05
"Greenfields" - 2:15
"Virginia" - 2:27
"Our Winter Love" - 2:37

Side Two
"Cottonfields" - 2:27
"Cherry Beat" - 2:31
"Greenback Dollar" - 2:02
"Man with the Golden Gun" - 2:14
"Tender and Fair" - 2:19

The 1991 Jimco reissue contains the following bonus tracks:
"Barbados"
"Ridin' West"
"Walk Right In"

Personnel
Leon Russell – harpsichord, bass guitar, guitar, keyboards, piano, primary artist, producer, vocals
Tommy Tedesco – guitar
Jimmy Bend – bass guitar
Earl Palmer – drums
Joe Chemay – Bass, Vocals
Marty Grebb – Guitar, Saxophone
Wornell Jones – Vocals
Roger Linn – Guitar, Percussion
Lena Luckey – Vocals
Jody Payne – Guitar, Vocals
Francis Pye – Vocals
Bernetta Rand – Vocals
Mickey Raphael – Harmonica

References

1973 albums
Leon Russell albums